Abhishek Banerjee (born 5 May 1985) is an Indian actor and casting director, best known for his roles in Stree and Rashmi Rocket.

Early life and education 
Banerjee received his higher education in Delhi. He graduated from Kirori Mal College, University of Delhi, and was a member of Kirori Mal's dramatics society. Before graduating from Kirori Mal college, he completed his school at Kendriya Vidyalaya, Andrews Ganj in Delhi. His birthplace is Kharagpur, West Bengal where his parents reside.

Career
He began his acting career with Delhi theatre. He worked in dd show school days. His first film appearance was in Rang De Basanti, as one of the students auditioning for a documentary role. He moved to Mumbai from Delhi in 2008. He worked in Knock Out as a casting director in 2010. He also acted in Soul of Sand in 2010. 

In 2011, he worked as a casting director in The Dirty Picture and No One Killed Jessica. He also acted in No One Killed Jessica in 2011. He worked as casting director in Bajatey Raho and Mickey Virus in 2013. He also acted in Bombay Talkies in 2013.

Banerjee acted in short films Fuddu Boys and Agli Baar in 2015. He also worked as casting director in Umrika and Gabbar Is Back in 2015. He worked as a casting director in Dear Dad, Do Lafzon Ki Kahani, Rock On 2 and You Are My Sunday in 2016. He worked as a casting director in Ok Jaanu, Toilet: Ek Prem Katha, Secret Superstar, and Ajji in 2017. In this year he acted in Phillauri and Ajji. He worked as casting director of Brij Mohan Amar Rahe in 2018. He acted in Stree in 2018. For this film, he was nominated for Zee Cine Award for Best Actor in a Comic Role in 2019. In 2019 he worked as a casting director of Kalank. In 2019 he also acted in Arjun Patiala, Dream Girl, and Bala.

Besides films, he also acted in web series like TVF Pitchers in 2015, Mirzapur in 2018, and Typewriter in 2019 where he played a key role as 'Fakeer'. He runs "Casting Bay" along with his friend Anmol Ahuja where they cast actors in advertisements, films as well as web series. It was established in 2017.  He played the role of Jin Liang in "Kaali 2 (2020)", in the ZEE5 web series in 2020. He played the role of lead antagonist and dreaded serial killer Vishal Tyagi (Hathoda Tyagi) in the Amazon Prime web series Paatal Lok. He was also the casting director for the web series. Abhishek's next film is Bhediya.

Filmography

As casting director

As Actor

Film

Television

Short film

Awards and nominations

References

1988 births
Living people
21st-century Indian male actors
Male actors from Delhi
Male actors in Hindi cinema
Indian casting directors
Indian male comedians
Hindi screenwriters
People from Kharagpur
Male actors in Telugu cinema